The ROTC Medal for Heroism is the highest United States Department of the Army medal awarded exclusively to Army Reserve Officers' Training Corps cadets. This award is presented to cadets who perform acts of heroism. As with other Department of the Army decorations, the award consists of a medal and ribbon, accompanied by DA Form 638. In the Army, this award is also known as the Medal of Heroism.

Criteria for award
To be awarded this decoration, cadets must distinguish themselves by acts of heroism. The act must:
Result in an accomplishment so exceptional/outstanding as to set a cadet apart
Involve acceptance of danger or extraordinary responsibilities
The Soldier's Medal is an authorized award in place of the Medal for Heroism for acts of heroism performed at Cadet Troop Leader Training.

Other persons eligible
Junior Reserve Officers' Training Corps cadets are also eligible for this award.

Notable recipients
Alaina Petty, Martin Duque, and Peter Wang, victims of the Stoneman Douglas High School shooting
Riley Howell, victim of the 2019 University of North Carolina at Charlotte shooting
Kaheem Bailey-Taylor, On Aug. 17, 2022, Bailey-Taylor was outside of a home on N. Bonsall Street in North Philadelphia, Pennsylvania when gunshots rang out. Without hesitation, Bailey-Taylor ran inside the house to find that multiple people had been shot. He helped one of the most seriously wounded victims and a fellow cadet get into a police car and stayed by their side. Bailey-Taylor is set to graduate from The Philadelphia Military Academy in 2024. "An American hero": PMA student awarded JROTC Medal of Heroism]

See also 
Awards and decorations of the United States army
Awards and decorations of the United States military
List of military decorations

References

Awards and decorations of the United States Army
Reserve Officers' Training Corps